Irina Bara and Mihaela Buzărnescu are the defending champions, but Buzărnescu chose not to participate. 

Bara partnered alongside Valentyna Ivakhnenko and successfully defended her title, defeating Ysaline Bonaventure and Hélène Scholsen in the final, 6–4, 6–1.

Seeds

Draw

Draw

References
Main Draw

Engie Open de Biarritz - Doubles